Islamabad United is a franchise cricket team that played in the 2017 Pakistan Super League (PSL). They were one of the five teams that took part in the 2017 competition and were captained by Misbah ul Haq and coached by Dean Jones. The team had won the inaugural edition of the PSL, but after finishing fourth in the group stage were eliminated in the first match of the playoffs.

Squad
In the 2017 Pakistan Super League players draft, Islamabad retained 17 players from their previous squad. They added Ben Duckett, Zohaib Khan and Shadab Khan to complete their 20 men squad. Later Steven Finn replaced Andre Russell after he was banned for a year for a doping breach and Duckett was replaced by Nicholas Pooran before the start of play-offs after an international call-up.

Season summary
Islamabad United played the opening match of the 2017 season against Peshawar Zalmi, winning by seven wickets and continuing their winning streak from the previous season. They lost their second match to Lahore Qalanders.

As the tournament shifted to Sharjah, Islamabad beat Quetta Gladiators, Sam Billings was top-scoring with an aggressive innings of 78 runs from 50 balls. A narrow loss in a rain-affected match against Karachi Kings was followed by a last-ball victory against Peshawar Zalmi, with Dwayne Smith scoring 72 runs from 59 balls. A loss to Lahore followed.

With the tournament moving back to Dubai, Islamabad beat Quetta Gladiators despite Quetta being 148/1 chasing 166 after 16 overs. Late wickets led to a one-run victory for Islamad, ensuring the team of a play-off spot.

References

2017 Pakistan Super League
United in 2017
2017